Inter TV is a subscription-based channel, entirely dedicated to the Italian professional football club Inter. It is headquartered at the training centre of Inter in Appiano Gentile. The channel offers Inter fans exclusive interviews with players and staff, full matches, including replays of all Serie A, Coppa Italia, and Champions League/Europa League games, in addition to vintage matches, footballing news, and other themed programming.
It first broadcast on 20 September 2000 as Inter Channel, with the current name being adopted on 28 September 2017.

Staff 
 Roberto Scarpini 
 Letizia Gallucci
 Alberto Santi
 Umberto Cabella
 Ilaria Alesso
 Federica MIgliavacca

Regular or semi-regular guests
 Evaristo Beccalossi
 Mario Corso

Former logos

References

External links
Inter TV (official website)
Inter TV on YouTube

Inter Milan
Sports television in Italy
Television channels in Italy
Television channels and stations established in 2000
Italian-language television stations
2000 establishments in Italy
Mass media in Milan
Football club television channels